Sheida Soleimani (born 1990) is an Iranian-American multimedia artist, activist, and professor. Her works have generated conversations in the field of 'constructed' tableau photography, as well as the intersections of art and protest, with a focus on Iranian human-rights violations.

Early life and education
Sheida Soleimani was born in 1990 in Indianapolis, Indiana and she grew up in Cincinnati, Ohio. Her parents are political refugees who were persecuted by the Iranian government in the early 1980s during the Iranian Revolution. Soleimani has mentioned her personal experience as an Iranian growing up in America, which made her aware of the "stereotypes of Middle Eastern culture by the West" at a young age.

Soleimani received her BFA degree in photography from the University of Cincinnati in 2012. She continued her studies and received a MFA degree in Photography from Cranbrook Academy of Art in 2015.

Career 
Soleimani's work highlights the relationships between powerful political people, groups, governments, and corporations, in order to raise questions from the viewer. The themes of her work are topics not often discussed in the West, for example, highlighting the women executed in Iran, and the relationship between power, exploitation and oil, among others. The work is often displayed as a photograph or video of a staged image, Soleimani uses various materials in the work including, soft sculpture "dolls", photography, props, masks, and cut-outs of digital prints.  

Her work has gained international recognitions in exhibitions and on publications such as Artforum, The New York Times, The Huffington Post, Interview (magazine), Vice (magazine) etc. Soleimani has presented multiple series of works, namely Medium of Exchange (2018-current),  To Oblivion (2016), and National Anthem (2015). Soleimani documented her experience during the COVID-19 pandemic with a series of photographs that were featured in The New York Times.

Soleimani is currently an Assistant Professor of Studio Art at Brandeis University. She previously taught at Rhode Island School of Design (RISD).

References

External links
Official website

1990 births
Living people
21st-century American women artists
American women photographers
American people of Iranian descent
People from Indianapolis
People from Cincinnati
Artists from Providence, Rhode Island
Rhode Island School of Design faculty
Brandeis University faculty
Cranbrook Academy of Art alumni
University of Cincinnati alumni
American artists of Iranian descent